GRIM (Groupe de recherche et d'improvisation musicales, roughly translated Group of Research and Musical Innovation), was a non-profit institute for improvised and experimental music. The GRIM was based at the Montévidéo, a cultural centre in Marseille, France.

The GRIM is a voluntary association (association loi de 1901), founded in 1978 by guitarist-composer Jean-Marc Montera and funded by the city of Marseille with a focus on organising musical events. The organisation hosted concerts, workshops, lectures, artist in residence projects and studio recording sessions, in addition to having a multimedia public library with books and music relating to avant garde music, experimental music, improvised music, sound art and contemporary music. It previously helped organise the festivals Nuit d'Hiver and Sonic Protest.
Allmusic bio about Montera</ref>

As of March 2017, the GRIM has been absorbed into the gmem CNCM, another creative institute also located in Marseille.

Educational activities
Members of the public (children, professionals, music-lovers, etc.) could access classes in which they were taught by music professionals over a fixed period. Regular workshops with founder Jean-Marc Montera (Department of Musicology of the University of Provence) were also available.

See also
 IRCAM

Sources and references
 Official website (English version)

External links
 Website of GRIM

Music venues in France
Culture of Marseille
Experimental music
Musical improvisation
Electronic music organizations
Contemporary music organizations
Organizations established in 1978
Music organizations based in France
1978 establishments in France